Elizabeth Tower is a  tall, 52-storey residential skyscraper in Manchester, England. The building is part of the first phase of the Crown Street development area at the southern end of Deansgate in the city centre, behind the Deansgate Square skyscraper cluster. It was designed by SimpsonHaugh architects and as of 2023 is the fifth-tallest building in Greater Manchester.

History

Planning
The planning application was submitted to Manchester City Council in April 2018 for two tall buildings, a 51-storey and a 21-storey tower subsequently named Elizabeth Tower and Victoria Residence respectively. The towers form the first phase of developer Renaker's Crown Street development, consisting of a combined total of 664 apartments. Elizabeth Tower contains 484 apartments.

Planning approval was obtained in summer 2018.

Construction
Construction of Elizabeth Tower commenced in 2018 and completed in 2022. The smaller of the two towers, Victoria Residence, reached practical completion in November 2020.

Facilities
Elizabeth Tower includes a gym, rooftop gardens, and a  swimming pool located on the 44th floor.

See also
List of tallest buildings in the United Kingdom
List of tallest buildings and structures in Greater Manchester

References

Buildings and structures in Manchester
2022 establishments in England
Skyscrapers in Manchester
Residential skyscrapers in England
Apartment buildings in England
Residential buildings completed in 2022
Residential buildings in Manchester